Tom Ruggles (born 25 April 1992) is a former professional Australian rules footballer who played for the Geelong Football Club in the Australian Football League (AFL). He was drafted by the Geelong Football Club with their third selection and forty-fourth overall in the 2016 rookie draft. He was delisted by Geelong at the conclusion of the 2017 season.

References

External links

1992 births
Living people
Geelong Football Club players
Australian rules footballers from Victoria (Australia)